Monopoly is a 1985 multi-platform video game based on the board game Monopoly, released on the Amiga, Amstrad CPC, BBC Micro, Commodore 64, MS-DOS, MSX, Tatung Einstein, Thomson MO, Thomson TO, and ZX Spectrum. Published by Leisure Genius, this title was one of many inspired by the property.

Gameplay 
The game contains very similar gameplay to the board game it is based on, with various physical tasks being replaced by automation and digital representations.

Critical reception 
Computer Shopper praised the game for its graphics and animation, and deemed it "excellent value". Your Spectrum thought the game was an "excellent conversion" of the board game, while Sinclair User wrote that the game was "very boring". 

In 1990, M. Evan Brooks reviewed the computer editions of Risk, Monopoly, Scrabble, and Clue for Computer Gaming World, and stated that "Monopoly has been released in numerous shareware and public domain versions which thereby weaken its standing."

When the game was released for the Amiga in 1991, Amiga Power deemed it a "sound conversion" albeit more expensive than its source material, while another from the same publication said it was competent but "arguably quite pointless".

References

External links 

 Monopoly at MobyGames
 ASM review
Review in RUN Magazine

1985 video games
Amiga games
Amstrad CPC games
Commodore 64 games
DOS games
Leisure Genius games
Monopoly video games
MSX games
Tatung Einstein games
Thomson MO games
Thomson TO games
Video games developed in the United Kingdom
ZX Spectrum games